The Dual State Monument is a monument located on the border of Union County, Arkansas, and Union Parish, Louisiana. The monument was built in 1931 to mark the centennial of the establishment of the Arkansas-Louisiana state line. It also marks the birthplace of Arkansas governor George Washington Donaghey, who commissioned the monument after his retirement. The monument features Art Deco bas-relief carvings on its east and west sides. The east side features popular modes of transportation in 1831, including a steamboat, stagecoach, and covered wagon. The west side displays a locomotive, automobile, and airplane to represent the modes of transportation common in 1931. The monument was the first Art Deco-inspired sculpture erected in Arkansas.

The monument was added to the National Register of Historic Places on September 11, 2000.

See also
 International Boundary Marker: monument on the Louisiana-Texas border
 OKKAMO Tri-State Marker: monument on the Arkansas-Missouri-Oklahoma tripoint
 United States Highway 61 Arch: monument on the Arkansas-Missouri border
 National Register of Historic Places listings in Union County, Arkansas
 National Register of Historic Places listings in Union Parish, Louisiana

References

Monuments and memorials on the National Register of Historic Places in Arkansas
Monuments and memorials on the National Register of Historic Places in Louisiana
Art Deco architecture in Arkansas
Art Deco architecture in Louisiana
Buildings and structures completed in 1931
National Register of Historic Places in Union County, Arkansas
National Register of Historic Places in Union Parish, Louisiana
1931 establishments in Arkansas
1931 establishments in Louisiana
Borders of Arkansas
Borders of Louisiana
Boundary markers